I Hate Summer is a 2020 Italian comedy film directed by Massimo Venier and starring Aldo, Giovanni & Giacomo.

Released about a month before the outbreak of the COVID-19 pandemic in Italy, the film is the tenth film of the popular comic trio; earning more than 7 million euros, it was the third highest grossing film of 2020 in Italy.

Production 
The shooting of the film took place from 17 June to 10 August 2019 between Apulia, Lombardy and Tuscany, in particular in Milan, Follonica, Giglio island, Mola di Bari, Lecce, Otranto, Ugento, and other places. The concert scene was shot in Terlizzi in Piazza Cavour, during a concert actually held by Massimo Ranieri in the period of the Festa Maggiore, on 6 August 2019.

Cast

References

External links
 

2020 comedy films
Films directed by Massimo Venier
Italian comedy films
2020s Italian-language films
2020s Italian films